A Milanese Story is a 1962 Italian drama film. It is the directorial debut of Eriprando Visconti.

For his performance Romolo Valli won the Nastro d'Argento for Best Supporting Actor.

Plot

Cast 
Enrique Thibaut as Giampiero Gessner
Danièle Gaubert as  Valeria
Romolo Valli as  Mr. Gessner
Lucilla Morlacchi as  Francesca Gessner
Regina Bianchi as  Valeria's mother
Ermanno Olmi as  Turchi

References

External links

1962 films
Italian drama films
Films directed by Eriprando Visconti
1962 drama films
1960s Italian-language films
Films scored by John Lewis
Films set in Milan
1962 directorial debut films
1960s Italian films